The study of the physics of computation relates to understanding the fundamental physical limits of computers. This field has led to the investigation of how thermodynamics limits information processing, the understanding of chaos and dynamical systems, and a rapidly growing effort to invent new quantum computers.

See also important publications in physics of computation

See also

 Digital physics
 Computation
 Theory of computation
 Reversible computation
 Hypercomputation
 Limits to computation
 Bremermann's limit
 Bekenstein bound

References

Lloyd, S., 2000, Ultimate physical limits of computation, Nature, 406:1047-1054.

Computational physics
Applied and interdisciplinary physics